Alla Aleksandrovska (born 7 December 1948 in Kharkiv) is a Ukrainian politician, member of the Communist Party of Ukraine, People's Deputy of the 3rd, 4th, 5th and 6th Verkhovna Radas of Ukraine.

Biography 

Aleksandrovska was born on 7 December 1948 in Kharkiv. She studied in Kharkkiv school No.116, graduated from Kharkiv Aviation Institute in 1972 as qualified mechanical engineer. In 1990s she graduated from Kharkiv Institute of Interdisciplinary Economics, with qualification in Management and Marketing. Since 1972 had worked as an engineer, then senior engineer, then as team manager of the design bureau JSC "Khartron". 
Aleksandrovska has been the First Secretary in Kharkiv regional Communist Party Committee and the Member of the Presidium of the Communist Party of Ukraine (February 2001- June 2005).

Member of Parliament

3rd Verkhovna Rada

In 1998 - 2002 Alla Aleksandrovska was elected the People's Deputy from the Communist Party, No. 24 in the list. At the time of elections she was working as team manager of the design bureau JSC "Khartron", Kharkiv. Also, she was Member of Verkhovna Rada Committee on Fuel and Energy Complex, Nuclear Policy and Nuclear Safety.

4th Verkhovna Rada

In 2002 - 2006 Aleksandrovska was the People's Deputy from the Communist Party, No. 21 in the list. 
Her activities during the plenary included:
 Member of the Committee on Fuel and Energy Complex, Nuclear Policy and Nuclear Safety
 Member of Verkhovna Rada Committee on Fuel and Energy Complex, Nuclear Policy and Nuclear Safety
 Secretary of the Group of Interparliamentary Relations with the Kingdom of Sweden
 Member of the Group of Interparliamentary Relations with Russian Federation
 Member of the Group of Interparliamentary Relations with the Republic of Belarus
 Member of the Group of Interparliamentary Relations with Canada
 Member of the Group of Interparliamentary Relations with the Republic of Iraq

5th Verkhovna Rada

In 2006 - 2007 Aleksandrovska was the People's Deputy from the Communist Party, No. 17 in the list. Activities:
 Chairman of Verkhovna Rada of Ukraine Interim Commission for audit of the situation with providing natural gas to Ukrainian consumers, payments for the delivered natural gas and possible violations of acting law at the energy market of Ukraine
 Secretary of the Budget Committee of Verkhovna Rada of Ukraine
 Deputy Head of the Group for Interparliamentary Relations with Syria
 Member of the Group for Interparliamentary Relations with the Arab Republic of Egypt
 Member of the Group of Interparliamentary Relations with Russian Federation
 Member of the Group of Interparliamentary Relations with the Kingdom of Sweden
 Member of the Group of Interparliamentary Relations with the Republic of Cuba

6th Verkhovna Rada
Since November 2007, Alla Aleksandrovska has been the People's Deputy of Ukraine in the 6th Verkhovna Rada, elected by CPU lists (No. 19) 
Positions during the plenary:
 Secretary of the Budget Committee of Verkhovna Rada of Ukraine
 Secretary of the Interim Commission of the Verkhovna Rada of Ukraine on the audit of the National Bank of Ukraine during the financial crisis
 Member of the Special Control Commission of the Verkhovna Rada of Ukraine on privatization issues
 Head of the Group for Interparliamentary Relations with Syria
 Member of the Group of Interparliamentary Relations with the Republic of Cuba

Aleksandrovska did not return to parliament after the 2012 Ukrainian parliamentary election after losing in single-member districts number 170 (first-past-the-post wins a parliament seat) located in Kharkiv.

See also
2007 Ukrainian parliamentary election
List of Ukrainian Parliament Members 2007

External links
Alla Aleksandrovskaya' profile at the official web site of Verkhovna Rada

References 

Living people
Politicians from Kharkiv
Third convocation members of the Verkhovna Rada
Fourth convocation members of the Verkhovna Rada
Fifth convocation members of the Verkhovna Rada
Sixth convocation members of the Verkhovna Rada
Communist Party of Ukraine politicians
1948 births
20th-century Ukrainian politicians
20th-century Ukrainian women politicians
21st-century Ukrainian politicians
21st-century Ukrainian women politicians
Women members of the Verkhovna Rada